John Sandes (26 February 1863 – 29 November 1938) was an Australian poet, journalist and author.

Early life
Sandes was born in Cork, Ireland, the son of the Rev. Samuel Dickson Sandes, and his wife Sophia Julia, née Besnard. John Sandes was taken to England in 1872 and educated at King's College London, Trinity College, Stratford-upon-Avon, and Oxford University, where he graduated B.A. in 1885.

Career
Sandes moved to Melbourne in 1887 and joined the staff of The Argus, for which he was a capable musical and dramatic critic. Sandes, with E. T. Fricker and D. Symmons, were the original three journalists who conducted the "Passing Show" column by 'Oriel', a feature of the paper carried on by generations of writers for more than 50 years. A collection of Sandes' verses from this column, Rhymes of the Times, was published in 1898, and in 1900 appeared another collection, Ballads of Battle. The latter included the poem "With Death's Prophetic Ear" which gave Sandes a popular reputation. In 1903, he became a leader writer and reviewer on the Sydney Daily Telegraph and in 1919 reported for that paper at the peace conference. In 1910, Sandes' first novel, Love and the Aeroplane, was published.

Sandes was editor of The Harbour, a monthly devoted to shipping interests, from 1925 until shortly before his death at Wauchope, New South Wales. In his own name and under the pseudonym of "Don Delaney", Sandes was the author of several short popular novels, which were published between 1910 and 1917 and are listed in E Morris Miller's Australian Literature. In 1897, Sandes married Claire Louise (d.1928), daughter of Sir Graham Berry. Sandes was ill with cancer for eighteen months before his death. He was survived by two sons. He was an excellent journalist with a special talent for writing occasional verse.

References

1863 births
1938 deaths
Australian journalists
Alumni of King's College London
Deaths from cancer in New South Wales
20th-century Irish male writers
19th-century Irish male writers
War poetry